Therapeutic Crisis Intervention Also known as the abbreviation TCI is a crisis management protocol developed by Cornell University for residential child care facilities. The purpose of the TCI protocol is to provide a crisis prevention and intervention model for residential child care facilities which will assist them in:
Preventing crises from occurring
De-escalating potential crises
Effectively managing acute crisis phases
Reducing potential and actual injury to children and staff
Learning constructive ways to handle stressful situations
Developing a learning circle within the organization

The protocol was developed beginning in 1979 through funding from a grant by the National Center on Child Abuse and Neglect.

A review by the Social Care Institute for Excellence found however only two rigorous evaluations of Therapeutic Crisis Intervention (TCI) have been conducted, and these presented mixed conclusions as to its effectiveness.

TCI training may also include teaching of different methods of restraining individuals who are at risk of injuring themselves or others.

References

External links
Residential Child Care Project in the Cornell University College of Human Ecology

Spurwink Services

Behavior modification